Bokermannohyla astartea is a species of frog in the family Hylidae.
It is endemic to Brazil.
Its natural habitat is subtropical or tropical moist lowland forests.

References

astartea
Endemic fauna of Brazil
Amphibians described in 1967
Taxonomy articles created by Polbot